The Heartfelt is an album by Figurine, released in 2001. It was re-released in 2005.

Critical reception
Tiny Mix Tapes wrote that "there is little room to breathe, as we are continually fed the same staccato synth noises, coated with extra sugar and a side of jellybeans." The East Bay Express called the album "a post-Kid A masterpiece of wistful futurism and powerfully minimalist programmed beats."

Track listing
"International Space Station II" – 3:48
"IMpossible" – 4:10
"Pswd:stdum" – 1:28
"Rewind" – 4:04
"Way Too Good" – 2:12
"Stranger" – 5:01
"Time" (His mix) – 2:09
"Instrumental" – 4:02
"Pswd:natur" – 1:29
"Our Game (Is Over)" – 6:14
"So Futuristic" – 2:08
"Pswd:pttrn" – 1:27
"Heartfelt" – 5:08
"Let's Make Our Love Song" – 4:20
"[Untitled]" - 2:31

References

External links
The Heartfelt at Epitonic Records

2001 albums
Figurine (band) albums